William's Television Show was a book in the Just William series by Richmal Crompton. It was first published in 1958, and contained six short stories, far fewer than most books in the series.

The Stories
William on the Trail
William Takes the Lead
William Among the Chimney-Pots
William's Thoughtful Acts
William's Television Show
William Does a Bob-a-job
William and the Wedding Anniversary
William and the National Health Service

1958 short story collections
Just William
Short story collections by Richmal Crompton
Children's short story collections
1958 children's books
George Newnes Ltd books